Richard Cullen may refer to:

Richard Cullen (artist) (born 1970), British animator, designer and director, married to Darren Hayes, previously of Savage Garden
Richard Cullen (attorney) (born 1948), former Attorney General of Virginia and U.S. attorney for the Eastern District of Virginia